Ken Boden (born 5 July 1950) is a former professional footballer who played as a midfielder. Born in England, he represented Australia.

Club career
Boden spent his early career with Hull City, Scunthorpe United, Sheffield United, Matlock Town and Bridlington Trinity. He then spent the 1976–77 season with Doncaster Rovers, making one appearance in the Football League. Boden later moved to Australia, where he played for Newcastle KB United, Sydney City, and Sydney Croatia. During the 1978 season, he was the National Soccer League top scorer and Player of the Year.

International career
Boden made 26 appearances for Australia at all levels. He made 13 official A-matches, appearing in one FIFA World Cup qualifying match.

References

External links
 Ken Boden at Aussie Footballers
 Ken Boden: a league of his own

1950 births
Living people
English emigrants to Australia
English footballers
Australian soccer players
Association football midfielders
Australia international soccer players
English Football League players
National Soccer League (Australia) players
Hull City A.F.C. players
Scunthorpe United F.C. players
Sheffield United F.C. players
Matlock Town F.C. players
Bridlington Trinity F.C. players
Doncaster Rovers F.C. players
Newcastle KB United players
Hakoah Sydney City East FC players
Sydney United 58 FC players